The 2018 Atlantic Coast Conference men's soccer tournament was the 32nd edition of the ACC Men's Soccer Tournament. The tournament decided the Atlantic Coast Conference champion and guaranteed representative into the 2018 NCAA Division I Men's Soccer Championship. The final was played at Sahlen's Stadium in Cary, NC.

The Louisville Cardinals won the tournament over the North Carolina Tar Heels 1–0 in the final.

Qualification 

All twelve teams in the Atlantic Coast Conference earned a berth into the ACC Tournament. The top 4 seeds receive first round byes and will host the winner of a first round game.  All rounds, with the exception of the final are held at the higher seed's home field.  Seeding is determined by regular season conference record.  Ties are broken by overall winning percentage.  Ten of the twelve teams have been ranked this year and eight currently hold spots in the top 11 of the NCAA RPI.

Bracket 
*Note: Home team listed first.  Rankings shown are ACC Tournament Seeds.

Schedule

First round

Quarterfinals

Semifinals

Finals

Statistics

Goalscorers
2 Goals
  Ian Aschieris – Notre Dame
  Edward Kizza – Pittsburgh

1 Goal

  Haji Abdikadir – Louisville
  Elijah Amo – Louisville
  Alex Bautista – NC State
  Abe Bibas – Boston College
  Machop Chol – Wake Forest
  Joey DeZart – Wake Forest
  Cherif Dieye – Louisville
  Omir Fernandez – Wake Forest
  Jeremy Kelly – North Carolina
  David Loera – NC State
  Giovanni Montesdeoca – North Carolina
  Jelani Peters – North Carolina
  Mauricio Pineda – North Carolina
  Ryan Raposo – Syracuse
  Issa Rayyan – Duke
  David Sanz – Virginia Tech
  Tate Schmitt – Louisville
  Jack Skahan – North Carolina
  Kristo Strickler – Virginia Tech
  Brad Sweeney – NC State
  Nico Quashie – Virginia Tech

All-Tournament team

See also 
 Atlantic Coast Conference
 2018 Atlantic Coast Conference men's soccer season
 2018 NCAA Division I men's soccer season
 2018 NCAA Division I Men's Soccer Championship

References 

ACC Men's Soccer Tournament
Tournament
ACC Men's Soccer Tournament
ACC Men's Soccer Tournament
ACC Men's Soccer Tournament